Christer Boucht, born 4 March 1911 in Vaasa, Finland, and died 21 May 2009, in the same city. He was a Finnish-Swedish lawyer, adventure traveler and writer. Christer Boucht served as a young reserve officer in both the Winter War and the Continuation War. In 1966 he was the first man from Finland to cross the Greenland ice on skis and by dog team. He has written several books on his polar expeditions in northern Canada and the journey across Greenland. In some of his books, he has also described the experiences from Finlands wars during the second world war.

Christer Boucht was for many years an active member in the Finnish Arctic Society and in 2002 he became honorary member of the Society.

Finnish writers
1911 births
2009 deaths